"On an Evening in Roma" is a song released in 1959 by Dean Martin. The song spent 13 weeks on the Billboard Hot 100 chart, peaking at No. 59, while reaching No. 36 on the Cash Box Top 100, and No. 31 on Canada's CHUM Hit Parade.

Chart performance

References

1959 singles
1959 songs
Capitol Records singles
Dean Martin songs